Massimiliano Fuksas (born January 9, 1944) is an Italian architect. He is the head of Studio Fuksas in partnership with his wife, Doriana Mandrelli Fuksas, with offices in Rome, Paris and Shenzhen.

Biography 

Fuksas was born in Rome in 1944; his father was Lithuanian Jewish while his Catholic mother was the daughter of a French father and an Austrian mother.

At the beginning of the 1960s, he worked for Giorgio de Chirico in Rome. After he left Italy, he worked for a period for Archigram in London, for Henning Larsen and for Jørn Utzon in Copenhagen. He received his degree in architecture from the La Sapienza University in 1969 in Rome, where he opened his first office in 1967, the GRANMA, collaborating with his first-wife Anna Maria Sacconi.

From 1985 he has worked in partnership with his second wife, Doriana Mandrelli, who graduated in Architecture in Paris in 2007. Subsequent offices were opened in Paris (1989) and Vienna (1993), Frankfurt (2002) and Shenzhen, China (2008). Shenzhen Bao'an International Airport's new Terminal 3, which his firm designed and built 2008-2013 (with parametric design support by the engineering firm Knippers Helbig), is an outstanding example for the use of parametric design and production technologies in a large scale building.

Fuksas had two daughters with Doriana Fuksas: Elisa and Lavinia.

From 1994 to 1997 he was a member of the urban commissions of Berlin and of Salzburg. For many years he has dedicated his special attention to the study of urban problems and in particular to the suburbs. From June 1997 he was advisor to the I.F.A. (Institut Français d'Architecture) Administration Board. Since January 2000, he writes the architecture column of the weekly publication L'Espresso, established by Bruno Zevi. In 2000 he was (somewhat ironically in light of his practice of employing unpaid interns for periods up to two years) the Director of The Venice Biennale's - 7th International Architecture Exhibition - "Less Aesthetics, More Ethics".

He is visiting professor at several universities, including the École spéciale d'architecture in Paris, and Columbia University in New York.

On 6 December, 2021, Fuksas had his Lithuanian citizenship restored.

Main works 

 School at Anagni
 Gym at Paliano
 University at Brest and Limoges, France
 "Flora Tristan" University Complex, Hérouville-Saint-Clair, France
 Maison des Arts, Bordeaux, France
 Cave of Niaux visitor entrance, Ariège (department), France 
 Shopping Mall Europark 1, Salzburg, Austria
 Vienna Twin Tower in Vienna, Austria
 PalaLottomatica Facade, Rome, Italy
 FieraMilano exhibition complex, Rho, Milan, Italy
 Centro Congressi Italia, EUR district, Rome
 Urban master plan FrankfurtHochVier in Frankfurt, Germany 
 Nardini Auditorium and Research Centre, Bassano del Grappa, Italy
 Ferrari Headquarters and Research Centre, Maranello, Italy 
 New Exhibition Hall, Porta Palazzo district, Turin, Italy
 Armani Ginza Tower, Tokyo, Japan
 Armani Fifth Avenue, New York City, USA
 De Cecco Headquarters, Pescara, Italy 
 Zénith Music Hall, Strasbourg, France
 St. Paul Apostle's Church (Chiesa di San Paolo Apostolo), Foligno, Italy 
 Peres Center for Peace, Ajami, Jaffa, Israel
 French National Archives, Pierrefitte, France
 Shopping centre BLOB, Eindhoven, Netherlands
 Shenzhen Bao'an International Airport, in cooperation with Knippers Helbig, Shenzhen, China
 Tbilisi Service Centre, Tbilisi, Georgia

Works in progress
Piedmont Region Headquarters, Lingotto district, Turin
House of Justice, Tbilisi, Georgia
Australia Forum, Canberra, Australia
Is Molas Golf Resort, Pula, Sardinia, Italy 
Beverly Center, Beverly Hills, USA
Bandra Versova Sealink, Mumbai, India

Major awards
 1998 Vitruvio a la Trayectoria, in Buenos Aires, Argentina
 1999 Grand Prix d'Architecture Française
 2000 Accademico Nazionale di San Luca, Italy
 2000 Commandeur de l'Ordre des Arts et des Lettres de la République Française
 2002 Honorary Fellowship of the American Institute of Architects
 2006 Honorary Fellowship of the Royal Institute of British Architects, London
 2009, Gold Medal for Italian Architecture, Triennale di Milano, Milano
 2011 Ignazio Silone International Prize for Culture, Rome

References

Other references 
 Ruggero Lenci, Massimiliano Fuksas. Oscillazioni e sconfinamenti, Testo e Immagine Ed., Torino, 1996.

External links

 Official commercial site
 Massimiliano Fuksas - in Italian ARC
 Profile at Specifier Magazine
 Interview in the LEAF Review

1944 births
Living people
Sapienza University of Rome alumni
20th-century Italian architects
Postmodern architects
Artists from Rome
Italian people of Lithuanian-Jewish descent
Italian people of French descent
Italian people of Austrian descent
Members of the Académie d'architecture
Chevaliers of the Légion d'honneur
Commandeurs of the Ordre des Arts et des Lettres
Knights Grand Cross of the Order of Merit of the Italian Republic
21st-century Italian architects